The Bardavon 1869 Opera House , in the downtown district of Poughkeepsie, New York, United States, is the oldest continuously operating theater in New York State.  Designed by J.A. Wood, it was built in 1869 and served as a venue for various performing arts, community meetings, and celebrations until 1923; it largely resumed this heritage by becoming a general performing-arts facility in 1976.  In the interlude period from 1923 to 1975, it served as a cinema, although there were some live performances, especially vaudeville, during this period.  Originally called the Collingwood Opera House after its owner and operator James Collingwood, the theater featured an unusual two-stage dome.   Between 1869 and 1921, many notable figures of the day graced the Bardavon's stage, including Sarah Bernhardt and John Barrymore.

History
The Bardavon was designed by prominent Poughkeepsie architect J. A. Wood and built by James S. Post, the latter notable for designing or erecting architectural structures in the Poughkeepsie central business district and Vassar College.  An extensive renovation was undertaken in 1905 and supervised by architect William Beardsley, who also designed the Dutchess County Court House and Attica state prison.  The theater was not reopened until January 1, 1923, when it was opened under the new name The Bardavon Theater.

At that time, it was bought by Paramount, and in 1928 a Wurlitzer theatre pipe organ was added. This organ was removed in the mid '60's and installed in a private residence in Scarsdale, NY until subsequent dismantling by a private collector, and placed in storage. It is most likely the theater where cult film director Edward D. Wood Jr. served as an usher in his youth, although sources don't often specify the Bardavon by name.  In 1947, the theater was further modernized and a movie marquee added.  The style of the interior after the renovation has been described as neo-classic.

The venue continued as a cinema up until 1975, when massive redevelopment of the downtown area threatened it with demolition.  Sitting where it does, it was near-adjacent to the site of the new Civic Center and a proposed arterial highway project.  There were plans to raze the building and use the site for a parking lot.  Concerned citizens banded together to save the theater and were successful in getting it named to the National Register of Historic Places on August 20, 1977 — and renamed The Bardavon 1869 Opera House.  Since then, over $5 million has been raised and used to partially renovate the Bardavon, which is now in use again as a venue for a broad range of performing arts including theater, dance, music, opera, and other genres. 
The original Wurlitzer pipe organ was discovered in 1983 by the New York Theatre Organ Society, www.nytos.org, and a deal was struck for the renovation and re-installation of the instrument with NYTOS as permanent curator holding ownership of the instrument.

The Bardavon has been the home of the Hudson Valley Philharmonic for over 40 years.  In one notable 1953 performance, former First Lady Eleanor Roosevelt provided the narration for Prokofiev's Peter and the Wolf'''.

On 30 August 2020, The Bardavon 1869 Opera House offered a free online series entitled "Albums Revisited".

Performances

Actors and musicians who have performed at the Bardavon and UPAC

Al Pacino
Andre Watts
Ani DiFranco
The Bacon Brothers
Barenaked Ladies
B.B. King
Bela Fleck
Bill Cosby
Blondie
Bob Dylan
Bob Weir
Bo Diddley
Brad Mehldau
Bruce Hornsby
Buddy Guy
Buffalo Bill
Burning Spear
Butch Miles
Capitol Steps
Carol Channing
Cher
Cherish the Ladies
Chick Corea
Chris Botti
Chris Brubeck
Chris Cornell
Clint Black
Cyndi Lauper
Dan Zanes and Friends
Dark Star Orchestra
Dave Brubeck
David Bromberg
David Byrne
David Crosby
David Sedaris
Derek Trucks
Dickey Betts
D.L. Hughley
Don Mclean
Dr. John
Duke Robillard
Eddie Izzard
Eddie Palmieri
Edie Brickell
Eric Idle
Ernest Borgnine 
The Four Seasons
Frankie Valli
Frank Sinatra
Garrison Keillor
Gary Burton
George Carlin
Gladys Knight
Goo Goo Dolls
Graham Nash
Great Southern
Gregg Allman
Harry Belafonte
Harry Chapin
Harry Houdini
Henny Youngman
Henry Rollins
Hot Tuna
Ian Anderson
Indigo Girls
Itzhak Perlman
The J. Geils Band
Jerry Bergonzi
Jimmy Cliff
Jimmy Sturr
Joan Armatrading
Joan Baez
Joe Jackson
John Hiatt
John Philip Sousa
Jonny Lang
Joshua Bell
Kathy Griffin
Kathy Mattea
Keb' Mo'
Kenny Loggins
Keri Noble
Ladysmith Black Mambazo
Laurie Anderson
Les Ballets Africains
Lewis Black
Linda Eder
Liza Minnelli
Lonestar
Loretta Swit
Los Lobos
Los Lonely Boys
Lou Rawls
Lou Reed
Lyle Lovett
Madeleine Peyroux
Mickey Hart
Milton Berle
Natalie Cole
Natalie MacMaster
Natalie Merchant
North Mississippi Allstars
OK Go
Pat Benatar
Pat Metheny
Patti LaBelle
Peru Negro
Peter Frampton
Pete Seeger
Pixies
Quartetto Gelato
Queen Latifah
Ralph Stanley
Ramblin' Jack Elliott
RatDog
Richard Thompson
Richie Havens
Robert Cray
Ron White
Roy Hargrove
Rufus Wainwright
Ryan Adams
Sarah McLachlan
Sharon Isbin
Shawn Colvin
Sinead O'Connor
Smokey Robinson
Steve Goodman
Steve Martin
Steven Wright
Talking Heads
Todd Rundgren
Tom Hambridge
Tony Bennett 
Whoopi Goldberg
Wynton Marsalis
"Weird Al" Yankovic
Youssou N'Dour
Yo-Yo Ma
Zakir Hussain
Zappa Plays Zappa
Ambika & Priya Kala
Mychael Gallagher

Name by datesCollingwood Opera House:  1869–1921Bardavon Theater:  1923–1975Bardavon 1869 Opera House:''  1976–present

References

 Bardavon Architecture
 Cinema Treasures
 Poster for the event, Sunday, 23, September 1979

External links

 Official site

Theatres in New York (state)
Music venues completed in 1869
1869 establishments in New York (state)
Buildings and structures in Poughkeepsie, New York
National Register of Historic Places in Poughkeepsie, New York
Tourist attractions in Poughkeepsie, New York
Opera houses on the National Register of Historic Places in New York (state)
Opera houses in New York (state)
Public venues with a theatre organ